Umam may refer to:

 Emam, Gilan, a village in Gilan Province, Iran
 Umam Documentation & Research, a nonprofit cultural organization